Sports School may refer to:

 Sports school
 Singapore Sports School, a specialized independent school in Singapore
 National Sport School (Canada), a public high school in Calgary, Alberta
 Sports School (comic strip), a strip in the British comic Shiver and Shake